Microberardius is an extinct genus of giant beaked whales (subfamily Berardiinae) that lived during Miocene. The type species, M. africanus, is known from a partial skull which was found in South Africa in 2007.

References

Microberardius africanus at Paleobiology database

Miocene cetaceans
Neogene mammals of Africa
Fossil taxa described in 2007